Basie Picks the Winners is a 1965 studio album by Count Basie and his orchestra.

Track listing 
 "Watermelon Man" (Herbie Hancock) – 3:11
 "That's All" (Alan Brandt, Bob Haymes) – 3:20
 "I Won't Cry Anymore" (Al Frisch, Fred Wise) – 2:22
 "Exodus" (Ernest Gold) – 3:05
 "I'll Get By (As Long as I Have You)" (Fred E. Ahlert, Roy Turk) – 3:15
 "My Kind of Town" (Sammy Cahn, Jimmy Van Heusen) – 2:40
 "I'm Walkin'" (Dave Bartholomew, Fats Domino) – 3:34
 "Come Rain or Come Shine" (Harold Arlen, Johnny Mercer) – 2:51
 "Volare" (Domenico Modugno) – 2:44
 "Nobody Knows You When You're Down and Out" (Count Basie, Jimmy Rushing, Lester Young) – 2:05
 "Oh, Lonesome Me" (Don Gibson) – 2:59

Personnel 
The Count Basie Orchestra
 Count Basie - piano
 Billy Byers - arranger
 Leon Thomas - vocalist
 Al Aarons - trumpet
 Sonny Cohn - trumpet
 Sam Noto - trumpet
 Wallace Davenport - trumpet
 Al Grey - trombone
 Grover Mitchell - trombone
 Bill Hughes - trombone
 Henderson Chambers - trombone
 Bobby Plater - alto saxophone
 Marshall Royal - alto saxophone
 Eddie "Lockjaw" Davis - tenor saxophone
 Eric Dixon - tenor saxophone
 Charlie Fowlkes - baritone saxophone
 Freddie Green - guitar
 Wyatt "Bull" Ruether - bass
 Irv Cottler - drums
 J.C. Heard - drums

References 

1965 albums
Count Basie Orchestra albums
Verve Records albums